A Barbed broach is a hand-operated endodontic instrument used to extirpate the pulp tissue during endodontic (root canal) treatment. It is manufactured from the tapered, round, soft iron wires, and the smooth surface is notched to form barbs. There are smooth broaches too available, which act as pathfinders into the root canal.

Dentistry